Eurydame is a genus of South American earthworm in the family Rhinodrilidae.

References 

Annelids